This article is about the phonology and phonetics of the Galician language.

Vowels 

Galician has seven vowel phonemes, which are represented by five letters in writing. Similar vowels are found under stress in standard Catalan and Italian. It is likely that this 7-vowel system was even more widespread in the early stages of Romance languages.

Some characteristics of the vocalic system:
 In Galician the vocalic system is reduced to five vowels in post-tonic syllables, and to just three in final unstressed position:  (which can instead be transcribed as ). In some cases, vowels from the final unstressed set appear in other positions, as e.g. in the word  , because the prefix  is pronounced .
 Unstressed close-mid vowels and open-mid vowels ( and ) can occur in complementary distribution (e.g.   'sheep' /   'to omit' and   'little, small' /   'to emit'), with a few minimal pairs like   'to throw' vs.   'to jump'.  In pretonic syllables, close-/open-mid vowels are kept in derived words and compounds (e.g. - >   'string' →   'string-maker'—which contrasts with   'lamb').
 The distribution of stressed close-mid vowels (/e/, /o/) and open-mid vowels (/ɛ/, /ɔ/) are as follows:
 Vowels with graphic accents are usually open-mid, such as vén [bɛŋ], só [s̺ɔ], póla [ˈpɔlɐ], óso [ˈɔs̺ʊ], présa [ˈpɾɛs̺ɐ].
 Nouns ending in -el or -ol and their plural forms have open-mid vowels, such as papel [paˈpɛl] 'paper' or caracol [kaɾaˈkɔl] 'snail'.
 Second-person singular and third-person present indicative forms of second conjugation verbs (-er) with the thematic vowel /e/ or /u/ have open-mid vowels, while all remaining verb forms maintain close-mid vowels:
 bebo [ˈbeβʊ], bebes [ˈbɛβɪs̺], bebe [ˈbɛβɪ], beben [ˈbɛβɪŋ]
 como [ˈkomʊ], comes [ˈkɔmɪs̺], come [ˈkɔmɪ], comen [ˈkɔmɪŋ]
 Second-person singular and third-person present indicative forms of third conjugation verbs (-ir) with the thematic vowel /e/ or /u/ have open-mid vowels, while all remaining verb forms maintain close vowels:
 sirvo [ˈs̺iɾβʊ], serves [ˈs̺ɛɾβɪs̺], serve [ˈs̺ɛɾβɪ], serven [ˈs̺ɛɾβɪŋ]
  [ˈfuʃʊ], foxes [ˈfɔʃɪs̺], foxe [ˈfɔʃɪ], foxen [ˈfɔʃɪŋ]
 Certain verb forms derived from irregular preterite forms have open-mid vowels:
 preterite indicative: coubeches [kowˈβɛt͡ʃɪs̺], coubemos [kowˈβɛmʊs̺], coubestes [kowˈβɛs̺tɪs̺], couberon [kowˈβɛɾʊŋ]
 pluperfect: eu/el coubera [kowˈβɛɾɐ], couberas [kowˈβɛɾɐs̺], couberan [kowˈβɛɾɐŋ]
 preterite subjunctive: eu/el coubese [kowˈβɛs̺ɪ], coubeses [kowˈβɛs̺ɪs̺], coubesen [kowˈβɛs̺ɪŋ]
 future subjunctive: eu/el couber [kowˈβɛɾ], couberes [kowˈβɛɾɪs̺], coubermos [kowˈβɛɾmʊs̺], couberdes [kowˈβɛɾðɪs̺], couberen [kowˈβɛɾɪŋ]
 The letter names e [ˈɛ], efe [ˈɛfɪ], ele [ˈɛlɪ], eme [ˈɛmɪ], ene [ˈɛnɪ], eñe [ˈɛɲɪ], erre [ˈɛrɪ], ese [ˈɛs̺ɪ], o [ˈɔ] have open-mid vowels, while the remaining letter names have close-mid vowels.
Close-mid vowels:
verb forms of first conjugation verbs with a thematic mid vowel followed by -i- or palatal x, ch, ll, ñ (deitar, axexar, pechar, tellar, empeñar, coxear)
verb forms of first conjugation verbs ending in -ear or -oar (voar)
verbs forms derived from the irregular preterite form of ser and ir (fomos, fora, fose, for)
verbs forms derived from regular preterite forms 
infinitives of second conjugation verbs (coller, pór)
the majority of words ending in -és (coruñés, vigués, montañés)
the diphthong ou (touro, tesouro)
nouns ending in -edo, -ello, -eo, -eza, ón, -or, -oso (medo, cortello, feo, grandeza, corazón, matador, fermoso)
 Of the seven vocalic phonemes of the tonic and pretonic syllables, only  has a set of different renderings (allophones), forced by its context:
  (short central): normal realization of the phoneme.
  (long central): due to contraction, as in   'frog' <  < Latin .
  (short retracted front): before a palatal consonant.
 All dialectal forms of Galician but Ancarese, spoken in the Ancares valley in León, have lost the phonemic quality of mediaeval nasal vowels. Nevertheless, any vowel is nasalized in contact with a nasal consonant.
 The vocalic system of Galician language is heavily influenced by metaphony. Regressive metaphony is produced either by a final , which tend to open medium vowels, or by a final , which can have the reverse effect. As a result, metaphony affects most notably words with gender opposition:   ('father-in-law') vs.   ('mother-in-law').

Diphthongs
Galician language possesses a large set of falling diphthongs:

There are also a certain number of rising diphthongs, but they are not characteristic of the language and tend to be pronounced as hiatus.

Consonants 

Voiced plosives (and ) are lenited (weakened) to approximants or fricatives in all instances, except after a pause or a nasal consonant; e.g.  'a cat' is pronounced , whilst  'the cat' is pronounced .

During the modern period, Galician consonants have undergone significant sound changes that closely parallel the evolution of Spanish consonants, including the following changes that neutralized the opposition of voiced fricatives / voiceless fricatives:
  > ;
  > ;

For a comparison, see Differences between Spanish and Portuguese: Sibilants. This may be glottal , pharyngeal , uvular , or velar .

The distribution of the two rhotics  and  closely parallels that of Spanish. Between vowels, the two contrast (e.g.

Spanish has been experiencing a centuries-long consonant shift in which the lateral consonant  comes to be pronounced as a fricative  (see ). This merger, which is almost complete for Spanish in Spain, has slightly influenced other varieties spoken in Spain, including some Galician ones, but it is rejected by Galician language institutions. In this respect, it can be said that Portuguese is phonologically more conservative than Galician.

References

Bibliography

 
 
 
 

Phonology
Italic phonologies